Idris Abdul Wakil (10 April 1925 – 15 March 2000) was the President of Zanzibar from 24 October 1985 to 25 October 1990.

References

1925 births
2000 deaths
Presidents of Zanzibar
Afro-Shirazi Party politicians
Chama Cha Mapinduzi politicians
Tanzanian Muslims
Ambassadors of Tanzania to the Netherlands